The Malaysian Rapid Deployment Force (Abbr.: RDF) is a force that capable to be quickly deployed during an emergency (wartime or peacetime) to various places in short time notice usually via air transport or light land transport. There are two components in Malaysia RDF which are — Military component and non-military component. The units that associated with the Malaysian RDF has an elite forces status because of their work of nature that needed them to always on prepare and ready to be deployed to hostile or challenging locations.

History 
On 10 October 1994, three existing Malaysian Army airborne battalion, the 8th Royal Ranger Regiment (Para), 9th Royal Malay Regiment (Para) and 17th Royal Malay Regiment (Para) was reorganised and redesignated into one single airborne forces — the 10th Parachute Brigade, also known as 10 Para. The Malaysian Prime Minister, Mahathir Mohamad then officially give the Rapid Deployment Force role and status to the 10 Para.

In March 2011, the Fire and Rescue Department of Malaysia (FRDM) established the Special Tactical Operation and Rescue Team of Malaysia, or popularly known as STORM. The new team is originally functioning as a Special Rescue Unit for incidents involving urban area, landslides, high-building rescue, wide-area search and rescue (SAR), forest fire, flood and massive natural disaster for West Malaysia region. In March 2014, after the MH370 went missing, the scope and capabilities of the STORM are widened to include SAR for aircraft crashes. The team was re-trained to be part of the Rapid Deployment Force.

Components 
There are two components in the Malaysian Rapid Deployment Force. The military component was added in 1994 while the non-military component was added in 2014. The military component of the Malaysian Rapid Deployment is well known for its parachute capability while the non-military components are spread throughout the nation and act as the first responder team during an emergency. The units under the RDF are trained hard to achieve the status of an elite unit.

Military component 

Officially known as the Rapid Deployment Forces of Malaysian Armed Forces (RDF-MAF). This component is a key component for the Malaysian RDF. Currently, there is only the 10th Parachute Brigade inside this component. This component is supported by the Royal Malaysian Air Force (RMAF) for air transportation. Few platoons are based at the RMAF Airbase for Quick reaction force roles. The members of the RDF-MAF can be identified with its maroon 'PAC' shoulder tab on their left shoulder. PAC is the acronym for the Pasukan Aturgerak Cepat. Its members are trained as parachute forces.

Non-military component 
The Special Tactical Operation and Rescue Team of Malaysia (STORM) is the FRDM's Urban search and rescue (USAR) team. Established in 2011 to operate together with the Federal Government Heavy USAR Taskforce, the SMART team, in the case of emergency happened in the cities at West Malaysia. The STORM's role later was expanded to include aircraft crashes SAR and its region of operations were widened to include East Malaysia. The STORM is the most elite unit in the FRDM and its members are spread throughout all FRDM State's Headquarters. Its members can be identified with the 'STORM' unit patch and the 'STORM' Camouflage Dress.

References 

Malaysian Army
1994 establishments in Malaysia